James Blair Down is a Canadian citizen who operated a large telemarketing scam with others. On November 7, 1999, the CBS highly rated television show 60 Minutes aired an interview with Martin S. Kenney that was conducted by Mike Wallace as part of a program segment called Con Man that focused on Kenney's firm Interclaim, which worked in conjunction with the FBI to attempt to recover millions of dollars of investor funds stolen in the telemarking fraud by Blair Down.

References

External links 
The New World War
The lawsuit capital Lawyers bring an international class action case to rural Madison County. Why?
The Art of Asset Recovery
Martin Kenney & Co.

Canadian fraudsters
Telemarketing
Year of birth missing (living people)
Living people